Joseph Aureille (1 April 1914 – 25 November 1981) was a French racing cyclist. He rode in the 1939 Tour de France.

References

1914 births
1981 deaths
French male cyclists
Place of birth missing